The following is a list of universities in Xinjiang Uighur Autonomous Region, China, by cities:

References
List of Chinese Higher Education Institutions — Ministry of Education
List of Chinese universities, including official links
Xinjiang Institutions Admitting International Students

 
Xinjiang